This is a list of strawberry dishes, foods and beverages, which use strawberry as a primary ingredient. Several desserts use strawberries as a main ingredient, and strawberries are also used as a topping on some foods, such as French toast, waffles and pastries.

Strawberry dishes

Beverages

See also

 List of fruit dishes
 List of strawberry topics
 Strawberry Festival
 Strawberry sauce

References

Strawberry